Abel Ashworth (second ¼ 1864 – 10 January 1938) was an English rugby union footballer who played in the 1890s. He played at representative level for England, and at club level for Oldham (Heritage №), as a forward, e.g. front row, lock, or back row. Prior to Tuesday 2 June 1896, Oldham was a rugby union club.

Background
Abel Ashworth's birth was registered in Ashton-under-Lyne district, Lancashire, he died aged 73 in Oldham, Lancashire.

Playing career

Leicester
Abel Ashworth played two games for Leicester Tigers on their Easter tour to Wales in 1890. He played against Cardiff and Newport on Monday 7 April 1890 and Tuesday 8 April 1890 respectively.  Along with Richard Cattell he became the first future England international to play for Leicester.

International honours
Abel Ashworth won a cap for England while at Oldham in 1892 against Ireland.

Change of Code
When Oldham converted from the rugby union code to the rugby league code on Tuesday 2 June 1896, Abel Ashworth would have been 31 years of age. Consequently, he may have been both a rugby union and rugby league footballer for Oldham.

References

External links
Search for "Ashworth" at rugbyleagueproject.org
Statistics at orl-heritagetrust.org.uk
Search for "Abel Ashworth" at britishnewspaperarchive.co.uk

1864 births
1938 deaths
England international rugby union players
English rugby union players
Leicester Tigers players
Oldham R.L.F.C. players
Rugby union forwards
Rugby union players from Ashton-under-Lyne